Jorge Campillo (born 1 June 1986) is a Spanish professional golfer who plays on the European Tour. He has won on the tour, the 2019 Trophée Hassan II and the 2020 Commercial Bank Qatar Masters.

Amateur career
After attending the Spanish national training centre as a junior, Campillo elected to play college golf at Indiana University in the United States. Campillo would go on to become one of the most successful players in the university's history, winning nine intercollegiate titles and being named to the Golfweek First Team All-American squad. He finished second in the 2008 NCAA championship. He also played in the Palmer Cup for Europe in 2007, 2008 and 2009.

Professional career
Campillo turned professional on graduating in 2009 and began playing on invites to the European and Challenge Tours. He recorded top-10 finishes on both tours and ended the season 98th on the Challenge Tour standings. He played full-time on the Challenge Tour in 2010, improving to 87th in the standings and reaching the final stage of qualifying school, but his breakthrough year was 2011. Campillo recorded two runner-up finishes on the Challenge Tour, in the Acaya Open and the Rolex Trophy, on his way to ninth place in the rankings and promotion to the European Tour.

Campillo made a good start on the European Tour, finishing tied for second place in the Avantha Masters in New Delhi, India in February 2012. He has also finished tied for second place in the Nelson Mandela Championship in December 2013 and in the Tshwane Open in March 2017 and was runner-up in the 2018 Maybank Championship.

Campillo made a good start to 2019 with two more runner-up finishes, in the Oman Open and the Commercial Bank Qatar Masters. In April he won the Trophée Hassan II by 2 strokes, his first European Tour win after 229 European Tour starts.

In March 2020, Campillo won the Commercial Bank Qatar Masters in Doha, Qatar, after winning a five-hole sudden death playoff.

In March 2023, Campillo won the Magical Kenya Open. He shot a final-round 66 to win by two shots ahead of Masahiro Kawamura.

Amateur wins
2006 Boilermaker Invitational
2007 Sofitel Biarritz Cup, Gado North Texas Classic, Pinehurst Intercollegiate
2008 UMB Bank-Mizzou Tiger Classic, Boilermaker Invitational, Big Ten Championship, Wolf Run Intercollegiate, Windon Memorial Classic
2009 Adidas Hoosier Invitational

Professional wins (3)

European Tour wins (3)

European Tour playoff record (1–0)

Results in major championships
Results not in chronological order before 2019 and in 2020.

CUT = missed the half-way cut
"T" indicates a tie for a place
NT = No tournament due to COVID-19 pandemic

Summary

Most consecutive cuts made – 0
Longest streak of top-10s – 0

Results in World Golf Championships

1Cancelled due to COVID-19 pandemic

QF, R16, R32, R64 = Round in which player lost in match play
NT = no tournament
"T" = tied

Team appearances
Amateur
European Boys' Team Championship (representing Spain): 2003, 2004
Jacques Léglise Trophy (representing Continental Europe): 2004
European Amateur Team Championship (representing Spain): 2005, 2007, 2008
European Youths' Team Championship (representing Spain): 2006 (winners)
Palmer Cup (representing Europe): 2007, 2008 (winners), 2009 (winners)
Eisenhower Trophy (representing Spain): 2008
St Andrews Trophy (representing the Continent of Europe): 2008

Professional
World Cup (representing Spain): 2018
Source:

See also
2011 Challenge Tour graduates

References

External links

Spanish male golfers
European Tour golfers
Olympic golfers of Spain
Golfers at the 2020 Summer Olympics
Indiana Hoosiers men's golfers
People from Cáceres, Spain
Sportspeople from the Province of Cáceres
1986 births
Living people
20th-century Spanish people
21st-century Spanish people